The Balboa 22 is an American trailerable sailboat that was designed by W. Shad Turner and William M. Downing as a cruiser and first built in 1977.

The design was developed into the Windrose 22 and, with a new deck, the hull was reused for the Laguna 22 in 1983.

Production
The design was built by Coastal Recreation, Inc in the United States, starting in 1977, with production ending in 1979. Laguna Yachts purchased Coastal Recreation, renamed some models, and reused hull molds for other designs, including the Balboa 22's molds.

Design
The Balboa 22 is a recreational keelboat, built predominantly of fiberglass, with wood trim. It has a fractional sloop rig, a raked stem, plumb transom, a transom-hung rudder controlled by a tiller, a "pop-top" cabin and a swing keel or fixed shoal-draft fin keel. The swing keel model displaces  and carries  of ballast. The fixed keel model displaces .

The boat is normally fitted with a small  outboard motor for docking and maneuvering.

The design has sleeping accommodation for four people.

Operational history
In a 2010 review Steve Henkel wrote of the Balboa 22, "best features: Poptop gives six-foot headroom when erected. Worst features: Construction is below average—definitely not 'yacht quality.'"

See also
List of sailing boat types
Related development
Balboa 16
Balboa 20
Balboa 21
Balboa 23
Balboa 24

References

Keelboats
1970s sailboat type designs
Sailing yachts
Trailer sailers
Sailboat type designs by William M. Downing
Sailboat type designs by W. Shad Turner
Sailboat types built by Coastal Recreation, Inc
Sailboat types built by Laguna Yachts